ETO-SZESE UNI Győr  is a Hungarian handball male team from Győr, that plays in the  Nemzeti Bajnokság I/B, the second level championship in Hungary.

Crest, colours, supporters

Naming history

Kit manufacturers and Shirt sponsor
The following table shows in detail ETO-SZESE Győr kit manufacturers and shirt sponsors by year:

Kits

Sports Hall information
Name: – Magvassy Mihály Sportcsarnok
City: – Győr
Capacity: – 2800
Address: – 9027 Győr, Kiskút liget (ETO Park mögött)

Management

Current squad
Squad for the 2020–21 season

Transfers
Transfers for the 2020–21 season

Joining 
  Gábor Décsi (GK) 
  Dániel Repóth (GK) (from  Budai Farkasok KKUK)
  Ádám Barnyák (LP) 

Leaving 
  László Nahaj (GK) 
  Dávid Pulai (GK) (to  Tatai AC)  Miklós Schneider (CB) (to  Tatai AC)

Previous Squads

Honours

Recent seasons
Seasons in Nemzeti Bajnokság I: 17
Seasons in Nemzeti Bajnokság I/B: 13

References

External links
  
 

Hungarian handball clubs
Sport in Győr